Roman Catholicism is a minority religious denomination in Shaanxi, a province of China. In Xi'an, there is the cathedral of St Francis. Shaanxi has experienced the persecution of Christians.

History
Catholicism entered Shaanxi before 1700. Zan Jia Cun is a village with a Catholic majority and which is the origin of priests. Xiaoqiaopan is another village with a Catholic majority.

List of Roman Catholic dioceses with seat in Shaanxi
Roman Catholic Archdiocese of Xi’an
Roman Catholic Diocese of Fengxiang
Roman Catholic Diocese of Hanzhong
Roman Catholic Diocese of Sanyuan
Roman Catholic Diocese of Yan’an
Roman Catholic Diocese of Zhouzhi

See also
 Mentuhui
 Catholic Church in Zhifang
 Catholic Church in Sichuan – neighbouring province

References

Christianity in Shaanxi
Catholic Church in China